Böhm may refer to:

 Böhm (wind), a cold katabatic wind in the Bavarian and Bohemian Mountains of Europe
 A German surname, meaning Bohemian. See also Bohm. Notable people with the surname include
 Annett Böhm, (born 1980), German judoka
 Carl Crack (born Carl Böhm)
 Corbinian Böhm, (born 1966), German artist
 Corrado Böhm, Italian computer scientist
 Daniel Böhm, German biathlete
 Eduard von Böhm-Ermolli, Austrian general of World War I
 Eugen von Böhm-Bawerk, Austrian economist
 Franz Böhm, (1895–1977), German politician and jurist
 Georg Böhm, German Baroque composer and organist
 Gottfried Böhm, German architect
 Hans Böhm (Drummer of Niklashausen), shepherd, drummer and preacher
 Joseph Böhm, Austrian violinist and teacher
 Joseph Edgar Böhm, sculptor
 Karl Böhm, (1894–1981), Austrian conductor
 Karl Leopold Böhm (1806–1859), Austrian cellist
 Karlheinz Böhm, (1928–2014), Austrian actor 
 Katharina Böhm, (born 1964), Austrian actress and daughter of Karlheinz Böhm
 Siegfried Böhm (1928–1980), East German politician
 Theobald Böhm, (1794–1881), German inventor and musician
Boehm system, his fingering system for flute
 Werner Böhm, (1941–2020), German musician and singer

See also 
 Boehm
 Bohm (disambiguation)
 Böhme (disambiguation)
 Böhmer

German-language surnames
Ethnonymic surnames